The Salzburger Liga, is since the 2010–11 season, the top division in Salzburg football and the fourth-highest division in Austria. The association responsible for the league is the Salzburg Football Association.

In general, per season one team moves up into the Austrian Regional League West, and two teams moves down to the 1. Landesliga. Depending on the number of clubs from Salzburg descending from the Regional League West the number of teams moving up from the Salzburger Liga can vary.

2022-23 member clubs 

SK Adnet
UFC Altenmarkt
FC Bergheim
TSU Bramberg
SV Bürmoos
USC Eugendorf
UFC SV Hallwang
TSV Neumarkt
FC Puch
UFC Siezenheim
SV Straßwalchen
UFV Thalgau
ASV  Salzburg 
SV Schwarzach

External links
 Salzburg Football Association

References

Sport in Salzburg (state)
Football competitions in Austria